The 2nd Vienna Grand Prix was a motor race, run to Formula One rules, held on 16 April 1961 at Aspern Circuit. The race was run over 55 laps of the circuit, and was won comfortably by British driver Stirling Moss in a Lotus 18.

Results

References

 "The Grand Prix Who's Who", Steve Small, 1995.
 "The Formula One Record Book", John Thompson, 1974.

Vienna Grand Prix